The Diatto Ottovù Zagato is a sports car designed and built by Milanese coachbuilder Carrozzeria Zagato for two of its clients. Coinciding with the 100th anniversary of the Diatto brand, the car made its official public debut at the 2007 Geneva Motor Show. The word Otto appears, in various forms, three times in the car's name.

Back in 1921, Ugo Zagato designed a lightweight and aerodynamic body for the Diatto 25 4DS chassis. Created in 1835 with a Perfected Wheel patent, Diatto made their first car in 1905 and often crossed paths with Zagato in their close collaboration with Ettore Bugatti, the Maserati brothers and Tazio Nuvolari.

The word "Ottovù" incidentally means "V8" in Italian. A clear indication of the engine powering this vehicle and show of the car's sporting intent.

Gallery

References

External links
 Diatto Official Website
 Zagato Official Website
 Diatto Ottovu Zagato set for Geneva debut Autoblog
 Zagato reveals Diatto Ottovù Zagato
 Diatto Ottovù Zagato headed for Geneva Left Lane News
 Diatto Ottovù Zagato Autoblog Italian
 Diatto Ottovù Zagato se prepara para debut en Ginebra Autoblog en Espanol
 Diatto Ottovu Zagato: feltámad a múlt Total Car
 Diatto by Zagato: Ottovù Project a Ginevra Virtual Car

Sports cars
Cars of Italy